Pakistan submitted its first film for the Academy Award for Best International Feature Film in 1959, three years after the incorporation of the category. and submit second time in 1963. The award is given annually by the United States Academy of Motion Picture Arts and Sciences to a feature-length motion picture produced outside the United States that contains primarily non-English dialogue. The "Best Foreign Language Film" category was not created until 1956; however, between 1947 and 1955, the Academy presented a non-competitive Honorary Award for the best foreign language films released in the United States.

After the submission of first two films, there was no any submission for fifty years because of the sudden collapse of Pakistani cinema. The growth of Pakistani cinema began from 1947 to 1958 and went through the golden age of films between 1959 and 1977, where good productions were uplifted by many directors, producers and writers. In 1977 the county's political condition became critical due to the overthrowing of the government of Zulifiqar Ali Bhutto by Zia-ul-Haq who bring Sharization in Pakistan. Since then, the Pakistan film industry went through many obstacles and was unable to overcome the consequences, good productions in industry were stopped and Urdu films were merely reached to the cinema. According to the Federal Bureau of Statistics there were at least 700 cinemas operating in the country but the number had declined to less than 170 by 2005.

In 2007, Geo Films took the initiative with concerted efforts for revival of cinema in Pakistan.  In 2007, Geo Films released Shoaib Mansoor's Khuda Kay Liye, which became the fresh breath of energy for Pakistan film industry. This single initiative gave confidence to investors and slowly, more multiplexes were built in Pakistan. In 2011, Geo Films further upped its efforts with the launch of Bol. Bol quickly became the highest box office grosser of Pakistan, a record that was held by any other film until the launch in 2013 of the Indian film Dhoom 3, which was distributed by Geo Films in Pakistan. Even though Khuda Kay Liye and Bol were box office hits and critically acclaimed, they couldn't be submitted as Pakistan's entry to Oscar due to the non-functioning Pakistani Academy Selection Committee.

In 2013, Oscar-winning documentary filmmaker Sharmeen Obaid-Chinoy was appointed by Pakistani Academy Selection Committee as its chairman to choose one film among those released that year to be submitted as Pakistan's Official entry to Oscars for a nomination for "Best Foreign Language Film" the following year. The chosen films, along with their English subtitles, are sent to the Academy, where they are screened for the jury. Before 2013, as no committee was formed, films were sent by directors by themselves. The 1958 Urdu film Jago Hua Savera was Pakistan's first submission, but the film was not selected from the selection process to shortlist and to final five nominations. In 1963 second film Ghunghat also failed to compete in selection process. Since then, no such film was submitted which met the criteria until 2013's Zinda Bhaag which became the first film that was sent for 86th Academy Awards, after the very long gap of submission than any other country.

Submissions
The Academy of Motion Picture Arts and Sciences has invited the film industries of various countries to submit their best film for the Academy Award for Best Foreign Language Film since 1956. The Foreign Language Film Award Committee oversees the process and reviews all the submitted films. Following this, they vote via secret ballot to determine the five nominees for the award. Below is a list of the films that have been submitted by Pakistan for review by the Academy for the award by year and the respective Academy Awards ceremony.

As of 2009, one hundred different countries have submitted films for Oscar consideration in the Best Foreign Language Film category. Pakistan was among the first countries to reenter the competition (countries were first invited to send films in 1956; Pakistan sent its first film in 1959), that have not sent any films in the past forty-five years. Of the one-hundred participant countries, 88 of them have submitted films in the past ten years, while 99 have submitted films in the past forty years. Pakistan is the only country to be absent for such a long time. In 2013 Pakistan submitted their third film after a gap of 50 years.

Pakistan's first Oscar submission, The Day Shall Dawn was a co-production between the two halves of what was then a geographically divided Pakistani state (now independent Pakistan and Bangladesh). The movie was filmed in Dhaka, East Pakistan (contemporary Bangladesh) by the East Pakistan Film Development Corporation (EPFDC) by a A.J. Kardar from Lahore (in West Pakistan)  and scripted in the Urdu language, which is native to the West. The film, which won a major award at the Moscow International Film Festival, was about the daily lives of East Pakistani fishermen. Pakistan's second submission, The Veil, is about the disappearance of a veiled young bride on the day she is scheduled to be married off to a rich young man. The third film Zinda Bhaag was the Punjabi-language comedy drama film, that encounters the life of three young-men trying to get rid of the life miseries and the fourth Dukhtar was a drama-thriller film, about a mother and her ten-year-old daughter, who abandon their home to save the girl from an arranged marriage to a tribal leader. In 2016, semi-biographical drama film, Mah e Mir was submitted which follows the life of a troubled poet who obsessed himself with 18-century legendary poet Mir Taqi Mir. In 2017 PASC submitted Saawan as an official entry to Oscars for 90th Academy Awards.

See also
 List of Academy Award winners and nominees for Best Foreign Language Film
 List of Academy Award winners and nominees from Pakistan
 List of countries by number of Academy Awards for Best Foreign Language Film
 List of Academy Award-winning foreign language films
 Cinema of Bangladesh
 Cinema of Pakistan

Notes

References
 General 

  

Specific

External links
 The Official Academy Awards Database
 The Motion Picture Credits Database
 IMDb Academy Awards Page
 Shermeen Obaid Chinnoy films, PASC

Pakistan
Academy Award